The Massandra Palace is a Châteauesque villa of Emperor Alexander III of Russia in Massandra, at the south coast of Crimea.

Construction of the building started in 1881 and was funded by the son of Mikhail Semyonovich Vorontsov, who had recently returned from the 1877-78 Russo-Turkish War. The construction of the palace that was initially designed by French architect Étienne Bouchard in the Louis XIII style was soon suspended after the death of Prince Semyon Mikhailovich Vorontsov.

The new owner commissioned his favorite architect Maximilian Messmacher to modernize the villa's design. Although Massandra was listed among imperial residences, no royals ever stayed there over night (rather preferring the neighboring Livadia Palace).

After the October Revolution and before World War II, the residence was used as a government sanatorium "Proletarian Health" for people ill with tuberculosis. After World War II it was used as a state cottage (dacha) under the name "Stalinskaya".

After the fall of the Soviet Union, Massandra Palace was used as one of the Ukrainian official residences where were signed the Massandra Accords in 1993. In 2014 after the Russian annexation of Crimea, the residence was taken over by the Russian Presidential Affairs Administration. A bust of Alexander III was unveiled in front of the villa in 2017.

Gallery

References

External links
 
 

Buildings and structures in Crimea
Museums in Crimea
Palaces in Ukraine
Official residences in Ukraine
Royal residences in Ukraine
Government buildings in Ukraine
Cultural heritage monuments of federal significance in Crimea